Krylatskoye is a Moscow Metro station in the Krylatskoye District, Western Administrative Okrug, Moscow. It is on the Arbatsko-Pokrovskaya Line, between Strogino and Molodyozhnaya stations. Before 2008 it was the terminus of the Filyovskaya Line.

Building
It is a shallow-level, vault-type station with a unique asymmetrical design. The curved ceiling rests on a white marble wall on one side of the platform, but on the other it reaches all the way down to the tracks. Wedge-shaped niches containing light fixtures run transversely across the ceiling, with the wide ends on the side with the wall. This has the effect of making one side of the platform brighter than the other. The decorative theme of the station is "gymnastics and sport".

Krylatskoe was designed by N. Shumakov, G. Mun, and A. Mosichuk and opened in 1989.

Moscow Metro stations
Railway stations in Russia opened in 1989
Arbatsko-Pokrovskaya Line
Railway stations located underground in Russia